Mazurka is a Polish folk dance in triple meter.

Mazurka may also refer to:

A number of musical compositions, including:
Mazurkas (Chopin), written by  Frédéric Chopin
Dąbrowski's Mazurka, the national anthem of Poland
Mazurka (film), 1935 German drama film
Operation Mazurka,  Australian Defence Force's contribution to the Multinational Force and Observers
"Mazurka" is a variant of toe loop jump in figure skating

See also
Mazurek (disambiguation)